Dempo Sports Club, or simply known as Dempo, is an Indian professional football club based in Panjim, Goa, that competes in the Goa Professional League. The club is owned and sponsored by the Dempo Mining Corporation Limited. Popularly known as The Whites, the club has been a constant participant in all the National football championships, and gained immense popularity in the last four decades of its existence. Dempo SC became the first Indian football club, that reached the Semi-final of the AFC Cup tournament in 2008.

The team has won several accolades and honors. In the 2004–05 season, the club won its maiden National Football League title. They won the league again in the 2006–07 season, and followed it with the three I-League triumphs in 2007–08 in its inaugural version, and then in 2009–10, and again in 2011–12, making them one of the most successful clubs on the national front with 5 National league titles; joint with Kolkata giants Mohun Bagan A.C. as the only teams to have the honour on 5 occasions.

The club has also won 14 Goa League Champions Cups, 4 Rovers Cups, 2 Indian Super Cups, Federation Cup in 2004, and Durand Cup in 2006. Dempo was the first Goan club to win Rovers cup. It also won the inaugural edition of AWES Cup in 2017 and won multiple times in Goa Police Cup. Dempo emerged as fifth ranked Indian team, and 711 universally, in the international rankings of clubs during the first ten years of the 21st century (2001–2010), issued by the International Federation of Football History & Statistics in 2011.

History
Dempo Sports Club began as Bicholim Football Club, which was a top First Division league side in the 1960s. Football lovers in the country remember the Bicholim Football Club as one of the most talented football club in the country. Players including Subhash Sinari, Bernard Olivera, Tolentino Serrao, Bhaskar, Kalidas Gaad, Manohar Pednekar, Bhai Pednekar, Ganpat Gaonkar and Pandurang Gaonkar are still remembered to the Bicholim Football Club on a completely different standard compared to the other sports club existing at that moment.

Bicholim Sports Club was later adopted by Dempo Souza in 1967 and was renamed Dempo Souza Sports Club. Even then the team remained one of the strongest team in the country with players like Eustaquio, Dass, Balaguru, Olavo, Colaco, Inacio, Felix Barreto, Thapa, Ramesh Redkar, Socrates Carvalho, Sadanand Asnodkar and Tulsidas Alornekar. In 1969, the team stood as the first runner-up in the Vasco Sports Club in the Senior Division League.

The Dempo Souza Sports Club finally became Dempo Sports Club, after Dempo bought Mr Michael D'Souza's stake in the Dempo Souza enterprise. However, Dempo Sports Club prospered when Vasantrao Dempo, the chairman of the House of Dempo, extended his benefaction to football team in an extensive manner. Dempo then came at par with the other business houses, like Salgaocar, Agencia Commercial Maritima, Shantilal and Sesa Goa who had their own teams.

Dempo Sports Club started out as Dempo Souza Football Club in 1961 and was taken over when they made the company their own Dempo Corporation around that time. The club was started by Michael deSouza and the logo and colours that the club wears currently was what he had chosen for the team. The club won their first Goan Senior League title in 1972. The club then won their first ever national pan-India tournament in 1975 by winning the Rovers Cup. British coach Bob Bootland took charge of Dempo in 1978 and changed the way India looked at its football with a revolutionary 4–3–3 style of play. The club then won the Rovers Cup again in 1978. The club defended their title one year later in 1979. Their first double. Dempo clinched Stafford Challenge Cup titles in 1975 and 1979.

Dempo then entered their "Golden-Age" during the 1980s. Dempo won a host of small cups and they also won the Rovers Cup again in 1986 by beating historic club Mohun Bagan. The club also won the Goan League in 1986 and 1987.

The club then won their first international tournament named POMIS Cup in Malé, defeating New Radiant SC. The club then won the Rovers Cup again by beating Mohun Bagan again and were then one of the original 12 teams in the first National Football League in 1996. The club then got relegated in 1999–2000 but got promoted the very next season, and then the club won their first NFL championship in 2004. Dempo also won the last NFL Season. Later, they clinched the Durand Cup title, thrashing JCT FC by 2–0 in the 2006 final. Dempo then won the maiden I-League season in 2007–08. As a result of this title win, Dempo played in AFC competition in 2008 during the 2008 AFC Cup, and ended their campaign as semi-finalist. They again won the league in 2009–10 and 2011–12.

In 2011, Dempo signed Trinidadian and Tobago international Densill Theobald as marquee player, who represented his nation at the 2006 FIFA World Cup. After the 2012–13 season, where Dempo finished in 5th place, they parted ways with their most successful coach Armando Colaco, with whom they had won 5 League titles. They appointed Arthur Papas, who had previously been the head coach of the Indian U23 Men's National Team.
Dempo finished their 2013–14 campaign with a 4th-place finish.

In March 2015, after losing their final match to fellow Goan and relegation threatened club Salgaocar 2–0, they got relegated for the first time from I-league and later participated in I-League 2nd Division. The club was hit by numerous injuries, which had ruined their season.

Before the start of the 2016–17 season, Dempo, along with fellow Goan football clubs, Salgaocar FC and Sporting Clube, announced their withdrawal from the I-League.

After their withdrawal from I-League, Dempo participated later editions of the I-League 2nd Division, the second tier of Indian football league system.

In the 2021–22 Goa Professional League season, Samir Naik managed Dempo end decade long wait, and clinched the title in style. In February–March 2023, the club participated in Stafford Challenge Cup in Bangalore.

Crest

The Dempo Sports Club crest is the official logo for Dempo Corporations sports clubs that it owns. The logo includes the words Goa (name of the state Dempo is based in) and Dempo Sports Club (team name). The logo also includes a picture of a golden bird in the middle of the crest.

Colours
The official colours of Dempo Sports Club are blue and white. Ever since their creation Dempo's home colours have always involved blue, mainly with the shirts while the shorts were always either blue or black. The away colours were always all white but then in 2011 when Dempo unveiled their away kit the shirt had black stripes on it. The shorts however remain the same.

Ahead of the club's 2020–21 football season, the Golden Eagles introduced the new home and away jerseys to show solidarity towards the health workers in Goa. The team announced that they will proudly bear the words “Thank You Goa’s Covid Warriors” on their Home and Away jerseys.

Rivalries
Dempo has a major rivalry with their fellow Goan side Churchill Brothers, popularly known as the Goan Derby.

They have also rivalries with other two Goan sides Sporting Clube de Goa, and Salgaocar, whom they faced in I-League and face in Goa Professional League.

Stadiums

Home grounds

Dempo SC has used Fatorda Stadium in Margao, Goa for its home matches in the domestic and regional leagues, which has a capacity of nearly 19,000 spectators.

Fatorda Stadium opened in 1989 and Dempo SC has been using it since for all its I-League matches. There have been rumors however that state that Dempo SC could soon very well create its own stadium in Panjim, Goa although not much has been released on the subject.

Goa Football Association owned Duler Stadium in Mapusa, became the home ground of Dempo during the 2012–13 I-League alongside Tilak Maidan Stadium (from the end of January). In Goa, Duler became the second stadium to get AstroTurf since 2006. The stadium getting the grant for the Astroturf from FIFA meant that the stadium was part of FIFA's Win in India with India program.

Training grounds
Sircaim was used as a destination for training of Dempo, the other being at Sanquelim. The Sesa Football Academy Ground is located at Sircaim and they used it for pre-season training from 2014 to 2015.

Ownership and finances
At the moment Dempo Sports Club's main sponsor and owner is Dempo Mining Corporation Limited. The club has been owned by Dempo since their creation. As part of the sponsorship from Dempo the club also named itself Dempo Sports Club and is classed as an institutional club in that case.

The finances given to the club are very limited which meant that the club was forced to spend less on infrastructure and proven players and spend more on local youth development.

Kit manufacturers and shirt sponsors

Players

First-team squad

Retired numbers
 10 –  Cristiano Junior (2004)

Current technical staff
As of 8 November 2016

Managers

The club hired their first professional manager in 2000, Armando Colaco; he remained with the club until the end of season 2012–13 and gave five domestic league titles. In June 2013, the club signed Greek-Australian manager Arthur Papas who was already working in India as the Indian U23 National Team coach.

Statistics
Only competitive matches are counted. Wins, losses and draws are results at the final whistle; the results of penalty shoot-outs are not counted.

Notable players

The players below had senior international cap(s) for their respective countries. Players whose name is listed, represented their countries before or after playing for Dempo SC.

 Densill Theobald (2011–2012)
 Simon Colosimo (2013–2014)
 Kasun Jayasuriya (2000–2001)
  Channa Ediri Bandanage (2002–2003)
 Beto Gonçalves (2010)
 Zohib Islam Amiri (2014–2015)
 Billy Mehmet (2013)
 Johnny Menyongar (2013)
 Carlos Hernández (2015)
 Ranti Martins (2004–2012)
 Sunday Seah (2003–2004)

Affiliated club(s)
The following clubs were affiliated with Dempo SC:
 FC Midtjylland (2011–2012)
 FC Goa (2014–2016)

Performance in AFC competitions

 AFC Champions League: 2 appearances
2009: Play-off round
2011: Qualifying play-off	
AFC Cup: 5 appearances
2005: Group Stage
2006: Group Stage
2008: Semi-final
2009: Round of 16
2011: Round of 16

Honours 

Widely considered one of the most successful clubs in the Indian Football circuit due to their domestic exploits, the club also holds the distinct honour of becoming the first Indian club to reach the Semi-Finals of the AFC Cup in 2008.

Roll of Honour

International
 POMIS International Cup
Runners-up (2): 1991, 1992
 AFC Cup
Semi-finals (1): 2008

Domestic

League
 National Football League
Champions (2): 2004–05, 2006–07
Runners-up (1): 2003–04
 I-League
Champions (3): 2007–08, 2009–10, 2011–12
Third place (1): 2010–11
National Football League II
Champions (1): 2001–02
 I-League 2nd Division
Champions (1): 2015–16
 Goa Professional League
Champions (15): 1972, 1974, 1979, 1980, 1981, 1984, 1987, 1988, 1994, 2005, 2007, 2009, 2010, 2011, 2021–22
Runners-up (3): 1984–85, 2006–07, 2019–20

Cup

 Federation Cup
Champions (1): 2004<ref name=aiff>Federation Cup. the-aiff.com. All India Football Federation. (archived).</ref>
Runners-up (5): 1996, 2001, 2008, 2012, 2014–15
 Indian Super Cup
Champions (2): 2008, 2010
Runners-up (3): 2005, 2007, 2009
 Durand Cup
Champions (1): 2006
 Rovers Cup
Champions (4): 1975, 1979, 1980, 1986
Runners-up (1): 1989–90
 Bordoloi Trophy
Champions (2): 1982, 1983
Runners-up (1): 1981
 Nizam Gold Cup
Champions (1): 1978
 Scissors Cup
Champions (4): 1992, 1993, 1994, 1996
Sait Nagjee Football Tournament
Runners-up (2): 1971, 1995
 Bandodkar Gold Trophy
Champions (8): 1976, 1978, 1982, 1983, 1984, 1986, 1990, 1991
Runners-up (4): 1971, 1973, 1975, 2016
Goa Police Cup
Champions (1): 2005
Runners-up (2): 1999, 2021

Other honours
 Stafford Challenge Cup
Champions (2): 1975, 1979
 Sher-I-Kashmir Cup
Champions (1): 1985 
 Jalil Cup (Varanasi)
Champions (1): 1985
 Plaza Soccer Trophy
Champions (1): 1975 
 Taca Goa
Champions (3): 1977, 1979, 1990 
 Four Square Trophy
Champions (1): 1982 
 Arlem Soccer Cup
Champions (1): 1985
Goa Governor's Cup
Runners-up (3): 2002, 2005, 2007
AWES Cup
Champions (1): 2017

See also
 List of football clubs in Goa
 List of Goan State Football Champions
 Indian football clubs in Asian competitions

Notes

References

Further reading

External links

 Dempo SC official website

Dempo SC at Soccerway
Dempo SC at Sofascore
Dempo SC at WorldFootball.net
Dempo SC at the-aiff.com'' (AIFF)
 Exclusive News On Indian Football Kick off India
 Dempo SC at Global Sports Archive
 Dempo News & Transfers at Goal.com

 
1968 establishments in Goa, Daman and Diu
Football clubs in Goa
Association football clubs established in 1968
Vedanta Resources
I-League clubs
I-League 2nd Division clubs